Hong Kong Chinese Christian Churches Union Pok Fu Lam Road Cemetery or Hong Kong Chinese Christian Churches Union Pokfulam Road Cemetery is a cemetery in Pok Fu Lam, Hong Kong. It is managed by The Hong Kong Chinese Christian Churches Union. It lies on the slopes east of Victoria Road between Tung Wah Coffin Home and Pok Fu Lam Road, facing Sandy Bay.

Many celebrities are buried in the cemetery, including the families of the four major department stores in Hong Kong (Sincere Department Store, Wing On Department Store, The Sun and Sun Sun Co. Department Store), famous author Xu Dishan, revolutionary Tse Tsan-tai, musician Ho Tai-sor and many more.

History
The cemetery was built in 1882 on the hills in the Pok Fu Lam neighborhood of Hong Kong, sandwiched between Pok Fu Lam Road at the top and Victoria Road near the bottom. It was built from the higher contours and as the cemetery grew, it was expanded downwards towards Victoria Road. Today, a part of the cemetery lies beyond Victoria Road.

Notable burials
 Au Fung-Chi (1847–1914), Sun Yat-sen's teacher of Chinese literature
 Wang Chung-yik (1888–1930), the first Chinese professor in Hong Kong
 
 
 
 
 Entao Liao (1864–1954), brother of Liao Zhongkai
 Zeng Guangshan (1871–1949), former Minister for National Defense of the People's Republic of China
 Yung Park (1865–1955), second senior pastor of The Church of Christ in China China Congregational Church (1903–1947)
 Yung Hei-kwong (1911–1983), son of Yung Park
 Xu Dishan (1893–1941), Chinese author, translator and folklorist
 Eddie Hui (1943–2009), last Commissioner of the Royal Hong Kong Police
 Tse Tsan-tai (1872–1938), revolutionary and co-founder of South China Morning Post
 He Dasha (1896–1957), one of the "Four Heavenly Kings" of Chinese music
 Li Yutang (1851–1936), a wealthy businessman in Guangdong, member of the United League
 Chan Tsz-kiu, founder of Mansfield College
 Li Shu-fan (1887–1966), leader of the medical profession in Hong Kong and member of the Legislative Council of Hong Kong
 Sun Jinwan (1896–1979), daughter of Sun Yat-sen
 Tai En Sai (1892–1955), son-in-law of Sun Yat-sen
 Catherine F. Woo (1890–1979), the first female doctor in Hong Kong
 Wai Tak-Woo (1888–1964), eldest son of U I-kai
 Man-kai Wong (1870–1927), founder of Hong Kong Sanatorium & Hospital
 Morrison Brown Yung (1876–1933), eldest son of Yung Wing
 Ma Zaiming (1822–1916), father of Ma Ying-piu
 Vicar Tsing-Shan Fok (1851–1918), grandfather of Ma Ying-piu
 Ma Ying-piu (1860–1944), founder of Sincere Department Store
 Lam Woo (1871–1933), building contractor
 Wendy Wong (1867–1924), son of Wong Shing
 To Ying-kwan (1881–1928), brother-in-law of Liao Zhongkai
 Alice Hormusjee Ruttonjee (1886–1974),
 Yam Chan (1945–2008), DJ
 Guo Hao (1880–1946), founder of Wing On Department Store
 Choi Cheong (1877–1951), editor and director
 Lam Chi-fung (1892–1971), founder of Ka Wah Bank and Hong Kong Baptist University
 Ma Yi-ying (1909–1974), founding principal of Kowloon True Light School
 Shih Kien (1913–2009), actor
 Lo Duen (1911–2000), actor and producer
 Li Tse-fong (1891–1953), entrepreneur and politician
 Ng Wah (1874–1950), leading contractor, developer of Pedder Building and philanthropist
 Lo Ming Yau (1900–1967), entrepreneur and filmmaker
 Ellen Li (1908–2005), politician
 Yeung Kai-yin (1941–2007), former chairman and CEO of Kowloon–Canton Railway
 Renchao Cao (1947–2016), founder of Hong Kong Economic Journal
 Lai Sun Cheung (1950–2010), former professional football player
 Lee Wai Tong, footballer

See also
 List of cemeteries in Hong Kong

References

External links

 

Cemeteries in Hong Kong
Pok Fu Lam